John Walker is a computer programmer, author and co-founder of the computer-aided design software company Autodesk. He has more recently been recognized for his writing on his website Fourmilab.

Early projects 
In 1974/1975, Walker wrote the ANIMAL software, which self-replicated on UNIVAC 1100 machines. It is considered one of the first computer viruses.

Walker also founded the hardware integration manufacturing company Marinchip. Among other things, Marinchip pioneered the translation of numerous computer language compilers to Intel platforms.

Autodesk 
In 1982, John Walker and 12 other programmers pooled US$59,000 to start Autodesk (AutoCAD), and began working on several computer applications. The first completed was AutoCAD, a software application for computer-aided design (CAD) and drafting. AutoCAD had begun life as Interact, a CAD, written by programmer Michael Riddle in a proprietary language. Walker and Riddle rewrote the program, and established a profit-sharing agreement for any product derived from InteractCAD. Walker subsequently paid Riddle US$10 million for all the rights.

By mid-1986, the company had grown to 255 employees with annual sales of over $40 million. That year, Walker resigned as chairman and president of the company, continuing to work as a programmer. In 1989, Walker's book, The Autodesk File, was published. It describes his experiences at Autodesk, based around internal documents (particularly email) of the company.

Walker moved to Switzerland in 1991. By 1994, when he resigned from the company, it was the sixth-largest personal computer software company in the world, primarily from the sales of AutoCAD. Walker owned about $45 million of stock in Autodesk at the time.

Fourmilab 
On his Web site, Walker publishes about his personal projects, including a hardware random number generator called HotBits, along with software that he writes and freely distributes, such as his Earth and Moon viewer. Another notable book was called The Hacker's Diet.

The digital imprimatur
Among other things, he is noted for a  frequently cited article entitled The Digital Imprimatur: How big brother and big media can put the Internet genie back in the bottle, an article about Internet censorship written in 2003. It was published in the magazine Knowledge, Technology & Policy. In the article, Walker argues that there is increasing pressure limiting the ability for Internet users to voice their ideas, as well as predicting further Internet censorship. Walker said that the most likely candidate to usher what he calls "the digital imprimatur" is digital rights management, or DRM.

In popular culture 

Walker's interest in artificial life prompted him to hire Rudy Rucker, a mathematician and science fiction author, for work on cellular automata software. Rucker later drew from his experience at Autodesk in Silicon Valley for his novel The Hacker and the Ants, in which one of the characters is loosely based on John Walker.

See also 
 The Right to Read
 Amazon Kindle remote deletion controversy

References

External links 

Computer programmers
Living people
1950s births
Autodesk people
American technology company founders
Digital rights management
Internet censorship
2003 in technology